Shorea superba is a species of plant in the family Dipterocarpaceae. The species name is derived from Latin (superbus = magnificent) and refers to the stature and elegance of the tree.

Description
It is a vast emergent tree, growing to 75 m tall, the tallest measured specimen is 84.4 m tall in the Tawau Hills National Park, in Sabah.

Distribution
The species is found in mixed dipterocarp forest on well-structured clay soils in moist areas. It is endemic to Borneo, where it is threatened by habitat loss.

See also
List of Shorea species

References

superba
Endemic flora of Borneo
Trees of Borneo
Taxonomy articles created by Polbot